Still Making History is Ana Popović's third studio album, released on June 19, 2007 on Eclecto Groove Records, her debut album in the US and on her new label, produced by Grammy winning producer John Porter. The album explores the different ways we connect over the centuries. The album also looks at the various forms of love in its many forms, such as true love, new-found love, forbidden love. Global, cultural and personal history are all touched on. Still Making History made it onto Billboard's Blues Album charts on October 20, 2009, spent 13 weeks in the top 15, and peaked at number 4 on December 8 and 15.

Track list

Personnel

Musicians
 Ana Popović – vocals, guitar, slide guitar
 Jack Holder – rhythm guitar
 Dave Smith – bass
 Steve Potts – drums
 Al Gamble – Hammond B3
 Tony Braunagel – drums, vocal
 Lenny Castro – congas, percussion, tambourine
 Jon Cleary – clavinet, piano, Wurlitzer, vocals
 Portia Griffin, Jessica Williams, Cynthia Manley and Jacqueline Johnson – background vocals
 Scott Thompson – trumpet
 Mike Finnigan – Hammond B3, vocals
 Sam Shoup – bass
 Jim Spake – saxophone
 Terry Wilson – bass, vocals
 Texacali Horns – brass (Joe Sublet – tenor saxophone; Darrell Leonard – trumpet, trombone)

Production
 Randy Chortkoff - executive producer
 David Z – production and engineering (tracks 2, 4, 9, 11, 12 & 14)
 John Porter – production and mixing (tracks 1, 3, 5, 6, 7, 8, 10 & 13)
 Doug Sax – mastering at The Mastering Lab, Ojai, CA
 Sangwook "Sunny" Nam – mastering at The Mastering Lab, Ojai, CA
 Robert Stolpe - photography
 Joshua Temkin – artwork

References

2007 albums
Ana Popović albums